The 1948 United States presidential election in Kansas took place on November 2, 1948, as part of the 1948 United States presidential election. Voters chose eight representatives, or electors, to the Electoral College, who voted for president and vice president.

Kansas was won by Governor Thomas Dewey (R–New York), running with Governor Earl Warren, with 53.63% of the popular vote, against incumbent President Harry S. Truman (D–Missouri), running with Senator Alben W. Barkley, with 44.61% of the popular vote.

With 53.63% of the popular vote, Kansas would prove to be Dewey's fourth strongest state in the nation after Vermont, Maine and Nebraska.

Results

Results by county

See also
 United States presidential elections in Kansas

References

Kansas
1948
1948 Kansas elections